Lorenzo Dow Turner (August 21, 1890 – February 10, 1972) was an African-American academic and linguist who did seminal research on the Gullah language of the Low Country of coastal South Carolina and Georgia. His studies included recordings of Gullah speakers in the 1930s. As head of the English departments at Howard University and Fisk University for a combined total of nearly 30 years, he strongly influenced their programs. He created the African Studies curriculum at Fisk, was chair of the African Studies Program at Roosevelt University, and in the early 1960s, cofounded a training program for Peace Corps volunteers going to Africa.

Early life
Born in Elizabeth City, North Carolina, on October 21, 1890, Turner was the youngest of four sons of Rooks Turner and Elizabeth Freeman. His father completed his master's degree at Howard University, although he had not begun first grade until he was twenty-one years old. His mother gained the education allowed to black women at the time (six years). Two of Turner's brothers earned degrees in medicine and law. Turner's family's strong emphasis on education inspired him and helped him achieve academic success.

Academic career
Turner earned a bachelor's degree from Howard University in 1914 and later as master's degree from Harvard and a Ph.D. in English literature from the University of Chicago. He taught at Howard University from 1917 to 1928, and during his last eight years, he served as Head of the English Department. After leaving Howard, he founded the Washington Sun newspaper, which closed after one year.

From 1929 to 1946 Turner served as Head of the English Department at Fisk University. There he designed the curriculum for the African Studies Program.

In 1946 he began teaching at Roosevelt University in Chicago, where he was Chairman of the African Studies Program. In the early 1960s, he cofounded the Peace Corps training program to prepare young volunteers for service in Africa. Turner retired from Roosevelt in 1967.

Gullah research
Lorenzo Dow Turner is best remembered as the father of Gullah studies. His interest in the Gullah people began in 1929 when he first heard Gullah speakers while teaching a summer class at South Carolina State College (now University). Although established scholars then viewed Gullah speech as a form of substandard English, Turner sensed that Gullah was strongly influenced by African languages. He set out to study the language. For the next 20 years, he made trips to the Gullah region in coastal South Carolina and Georgia, interviewing Gullahs (often in isolated locations) and making detailed notes on their language. He also made recordings in the 1930s of Gullah speakers talking about their culture, folk stories and other aspects of life.

As part of his studies, Turner traveled to several locations in Africa, specifically Sierra Leone, to learn about the development of Creole languages, as well as to Louisiana and Brazil, to study Creole and Portuguese, respectively. He did research at University of London School of Oriental and African Studies on various African language systems. He wanted to be able to provide context for the obvious "Africanisms" he discovered in his Sea Islands research. "Such depth and breadth allowed Turner to locate Gullah culture and language within the broader complexities of the African diaspora in the New World, ... firmly outside the reductionist theoretical model of cultural assimilation."

When Turner finally published his classic work Africanisms in the Gullah Dialect in 1949, he made an immediate impact on established academic thinking. His study of the origin, development and structure of Gullah was so convincing that scholars quickly accepted his thesis that Gullah is strongly influenced by African languages. He showed the continuity of language and culture across the diaspora. Many scholars have followed Turner over the years in researching the African roots of Gullah language and culture. He created a new field of study by his work and an appreciation for a unique element of African-American culture.

Turner was strongly influenced by the American linguistic movement, which he joined at its inception. Through his Gullah research, he gave shape to several academic specialties: Gullah studies, dialect geography and creole linguistics, as well as being an important predecessor to the field of African American studies, which developed in the 1960s and ′70s.

Turner's pioneering work, which academics credit for introducing African-American studies to U.S. curricula, was the subject of "Word, Shout, Song: Lorenzo Dow Turner Connecting Communities Through Language" at Smithsonian's Anacostia Community Museum in July, 2016. Exhibit curator Alcione Amos said the Washington, D.C., museum acquired many of Turner's original notes, pictures and recordings from his widow, Lois Turner Williams, in 2003.

Turner died of heart failure at Michael Reese Hospital in Chicago, Illinois, on February 10, 1972.

Legacy and honors
 A junior high school in Chicago, the Turner Drew Language Academy, was dedicated to him (and to Charles Drew, an African-American scientist who invented a technique for storing blood).

References

Sources

Further reading

External links
 Biographical Information
 Turner's Research Leads to a Modern Discovery
 Text of "Africanisms in the Gullah Dialect"

1890 births
1972 deaths
Fisk University alumni
Harvard University alumni
University of Chicago alumni
Howard University faculty
Fisk University faculty
African-American people
Gullah
Researchers in Gullah anthropology
Dialectologists
People from Elizabeth City, North Carolina